Katherine Landing (often erroneously referred to as Katherine's Landing or Katherines Landing) is a recreational area located on the Arizona side of the Colorado River and Lake Mohave just north of Bullhead City in the Lake Mead National Recreation Area.

The National Park Service, which administers Katherine Landing, reports more than 1.2 million visitors each year. The area was named after a gold mine popularly known as Katherine Mine that operated in the vicinity in the late 1800s.

Facilities
The Katherine Landing facility includes a slipway, floating dock, rental boats and recreational craft, a restaurant, convenience store, 53-unit motel, RV park and a campground.

Fish species

 Carp
 Catfish (Channel)
 Crappie
 Largemouth Bass
 Rainbow
 Striped Bass
 Sunfish

External links

Arizona Boating Locations Facilities Map
Arizona Fishing Locations Map

	
Lake Mohave
Protected areas of Mohave County, Arizona